The 2004 WAFL season was the 120th season of the various incarnations of the West Australian Football League.

Subiaco, after eleven unsuccessful finals campaigns including six in succession, won its first premiership since Haydn Bunton, Jr. took them to the 1988 flag, whilst Swan Districts, largely clear of their severe financial troubles from the 1990s, played finals for the first time in a decade. During late May and June, perennial tailender Perth looked like playing finals for only the fourth time since 1979, but faltered badly in July and August.

The wooden spoon went to East Fremantle for the first time since their debut season of 1898, with three wins being the Sharks’ worst record since that debut year when they won one match of sixteen (though they also lost seventeen matches in 1968 and 1970). The blue and whites suffered from two narrow losses and a botched resignation by coach Rod Lester-Smith which was unannounced but definite before East Fremantle's Round 13 game against Subiaco. 2003 premiers West Perth, suffering a crippling injury toll, fell to seventh, which remains their lowest position since the great revival under Jeff Gieschen in 1993.

The most notable occurrence during the season was Peel Thunder being recognised with a scoreless match for the first time in any major Australian Rules league since Subiaco failed to score against South Fremantle in August 1906, due to having their score of 10.10 wiped when former Fitzroy and Subiaco rover Peter Bird was ruled to have not been cleared for that opening match. Despite this setback and losing their first eight matches, the Thunder managed to avoid the wooden spoon with five wins being their third-best record in eight seasons and still their equal fifth-best in the WAFL as of 2014. Peel also won the Colts premiership with a major upset against South Fremantle in the Grand Final.

The season was also notable for the Lions moving their home games to the redeveloped Leederville Oval and for the first night games at that ground, both of which were viewed as resounding successes at a time when the WAFL was struggling with its reduced profile.

Home-and-away season

Round 1

Round 2

Round 3

Round 4

Round 5

Round 6

Round 7

Round 8

Round 9

Round 10

Round 11

Round 12

Round 13

Round 14

Round 15

Round 16

Round 17

Round 18

Round 19

Round 20

Round 21

Round 22

Round 23

Ladder

Finals

Semi-finals

Preliminary final

Grand Final

Notes
Mother of then-current players Brendon and Adam Logan, and wife of former premiership player Ian Logan.Smith was drafted by West Coast, but knee injuries meant he never played a single AFL match.The ‘Prestige Loans Award’ was given to the club with the best result between Rounds 15 and 23, during which the nine WAFL clubs played each other once.

References

External links
Official WAFL website
West Australian Football League (WAFL), 2004

West Australian Football League seasons
WAFL